Robert Manzanárez Sandoval (born December 17, 1994 in Phoenix, Arizona) is an American professional boxer in the Lightweight division and fights out of Los Mochis, Sinaloa, Mexico.

Professional career
On August 27, 2011 Manzanárez knocked out the veteran Édgar Martínez at the Centro de Espectaculos de la Feria de León in León, Guanajuato, Mexico.

References

External links
Robert Manzanarez profile

American boxers of Mexican descent
Sportspeople from Los Mochis
Bantamweight boxers
1994 births
Living people
American male boxers